Pugilina tupiniquim is a species of sea snails, a marine gastropod mollusk in the family Melongenidae, the crown conches and their allies. This species and its Eastern Atlantic congener, Pugilina morio, were once thought to be a single, amphiatlantic entity. They have, however, been recognized as distinct taxa based on anatomical and environmental differences.

Distribution
This species is found in the Western Atlantic Ocean, in mangrove areas along the Brazilian coast, and north to the Caribbean.

Human use 
In traditional Brazilian medicine in the Northeast of Brazil, Pugilina tupiniquim (formerly referred to as Pugilina morio, an Eastern Atlantic sister species) is used as zootherapeutical product for the treatment of sexual impotence.

References

Melongenidae
Gastropods described in 2015